Troina (Sicilian: Traina) is a town and comune (municipality)   in the province of Enna, Sicily, southern Italy. It is located in the Nebrodi Park.

History 
Excavations have proved that the area of Troina was settled as early as the  7th millennium BC (a farm dating from that period, and a later necropolis). Of the Greek town (most likely known as Engyon) parts of the 4th-century-BC walls remain, while from the Roman age are baths. After the fall of the Western Roman Empire it was a Byzantine stronghold and during the Islamic period the religious and moral capital of the Greek and Christian orthodox part of Sicily; Roger I of Sicily had in its castle (which he captured in 1061) also a start base of his conquest of the island.

During World War II, Troina was the site of a battle between the Allies and the Axis forces. The town was mostly destroyed during the six-day fighting (31 July – 6 August 1943).

In 2021 the town began selling homes for as little as one euro in an effort to lure residents and increase the population size.

Main Sights

Santa Maria Maggiore
San Silvestro

Twin towns 
Troina  is twinned with :
  Coutances, France

See also 
 Battle of Troina
 List of Catholic dioceses in Italy
 Troina (torrente)

Sources

External links

 Troina Forum

Municipalities of the Province of Enna
Populated places established in the 7th millennium BC
7th-millennium BC establishments